Talking Back At Thunder is a 2014 Australian thriller film directed by Este Heyns and Aaron Davison, written by Aaron Davison, and starring Steven Tandy as the film's antagonist.

Plot
All is good for Jacob. A plumber by trade, he has a job he enjoys, and a fiancé whom he loves. He’s the quintessential, everyday man living his life in a provincial coastal Queensland town. A veritable bomb soon shatters his path by way of an old demon from his childhood.

Surrounding lush cane fields turn to icy tundra, as Jacob tries to cope with the crippling anxiety and haunting trauma that he’s managed to suppress over the years. Facing his biggest task yet, he is forced to tackle these issues before they swamp him and ruin his life.

Set with Northern Australia’s cane country as its backdrop, Talking Back At Thunder delves fearlessly into the barely-lit cavern that is anxiety, trauma, and rage in the everyday Aussie male.

Cast
 Steven Tandy as Phillips
 Melanie Zanetti as Kyra
 Kerith Atkinson as Dr. Wilson
 Aaron Davison as Jacob
 Nelle Lee as Tennielle
 Peter Marshall as Barry

Production 
The film was shot over four weeks, and set in Bundaberg, Queensland.

Reception 
Talking Back at Thunder was selected into the Boston Independent Film Festival, Colorado Film Festival.

Accolades

Release 
Talking Back at Thunder came out on VOD via film streaming platform, Ozflix.tv on 26 January 2017.

External links 
 
 Official Site

References 

Australian thriller films
2017 films
2010s thriller films